, is a Japanese shoot wrestler and mixed martial artist who most recently competed for RIZIN. A professional competitor since 2000, he has also competed for DREAM, Pancrase, DEEP, and World Victory Road. Kitaoka is renowned for his catch wrestling abilities which he learned studying under two of Japan's most respected catch wrestlers Masakatsu Funaki and Minoru Suzuki. He is also a Brazilian jiu jitsu blackbelt under Yuki Nakai. A master of the guillotine choke and leg lock submissions, Kitaoka holds notable wins over Takanori Gomi, Paul Daley, and Carlos Condit.

Background
Kitaoka became interested in mixed martial arts after seeing Bas Rutten and Masakatsu Funaki fight in Pancrase in 1996.

Personal life
Kitaoka spends his time taking care of his body, getting massages three times a week, utilizing saunas, and carbonated and ice baths. He also enjoys spending time on social media. Kitaoka also teaches at his gym and coaches his teammates.

Mixed martial arts career

Pancrase
Renowned originally for his catch wrestling abilities, Kitaoka made his professional debut for Pancrase on October 31, 2000, losing via majority decision. After submitting then 3-0 Kurt Pellegrino, Kitaoka drew with Heath Sims before losing to Katsuya Inoue. After picking up two wins to start 2005, Kitaoka improved to 12-6-8 before he faced future UFC interim welterweight champion Carlos Condit on October 2, 2005. Kitaoka defeated Condit in an upset, submitting him with a heel hook at 3:57 of the first round.

A leg lock specialist, Kitaoka would improve to 19-7-9 before facing Katsuya Inoue on January 30, 2008 for the third time after being defeating in their first meeting and a draw in the previous bout. Kitaoka lost via split decision.

Sengoku
After signing with World Victory Road, Kitaoka's first fight for Sengoku was a submission win over Ian James Schaffa at Sengoku 2 on 18 May 2008 before entering Sengoku's eight-man lightweight tournament. In the first round of the tournament at Sengoku 4 on 24 August 2008 he was put up against American Clay French. Kitaoka made short work of French, winning by submission due to an achilles lock at 1:21 of the first round. The win put him up against fellow Japanese fighter Eiji Mitsuoka in the tournament's semifinal taking place at World Victory Road Presents: Sengoku 6. Kitaoka again made short work of his opponent winning by a heel hook submission at 1:16 of the first round. The win earned him a place in the tournament's final taking place that same night against Kazunori Yokota. The fight proved longer than Kitaoka's three previous fights as it went the distance completing all three five-minute rounds with Kitaoka being awarded the unanimous decision, thus winning the 2008 Sengoku Lightweight Grand Prix.

The Lightweight tournament win set up Kitaoka to fight the last reigning PRIDE Lightweight Champion, Takanori Gomi, for Sengoku's newly created Sengoku Lightweight Championship. The two fought at Sengoku no Ran 2009 on 4 January 2009 and ended with Kitaoka defeating Gomi with an achilles lock at 1:41 of the first round.

In his first title defence, on August 2, 2009, at World Victory Road Presents: Sengoku 9, Kitaoka lost his lightweight championship to Mizuto Hirota.

Return to Pancrase
Following his title loss in Sengoku, Kitaoka returned to his home promotion Pancrase picking up wins over Jorge Rogrigues and Kuniyoshi Hironaka.

DREAM
Kitaoka faced former UFC fighter Willamy Freire at DREAM 17. Kitaoka entered the bout on a three fight win streak picking up victories in both Pancrase and DEEP. He won the fight via split decision.

Kitaoka faced teammate and fellow Yuki Nakai black belt Shinya Aoki at DREAM's year end event for the DREAM Lightweight Championship. He lost the fight via unanimous decision.

RIZIN FF
Kitaoka made his debut for Rizin Fighting Federation in 2016. He faced Daron Cruickshank on December 29, 2016, at RIZIN World Grand-Prix 2016: 2nd Round and won the fight via technical submission in the first round.

Kitaoka next faced Yusuke Yachi on July 30, 2017, at Rizin FF 6: RIZIN World Grand Prix 2017 Opening Round Part 1. He lost the fight via TKO in the second round.

Kitaoka returned at RIZIN World Grand Prix 2017: Second Round, facing Kiichi Kunimoto in a catchweight bout of 165 lbs. Kitaoka lost via unanimous decision.

After picking a first-round heel hook win in Pancrase, Kitaoka returned to the RIZIN ring at RIZIN 11 against Diego Brandao. While attempting a leg lock submission on the ground, Kitaoka left himself vulnerable to a flurry of right hands from Brandao on the top, being knocked out just 1:38 into the fight.

After losing to Brandao, Kitaoka lost in his fifth defense of his DEEP Lightweight Championship to Koji Takeda via unanimous decision.

Kitaoka returned to face Tatsuya Kawajiri at RIZIN: Heisei's Last Yarennoka! for New Year's Eve in 2018. After a fairly impressive performance which included a surprising Kitoka knockdown from a left cross, Kitaoka won via split decision.

He then faced Roberto de Souza at Rizin 15 on April 21, 2019. He lost the fight via second-round knockout.

Kitaoka faced Johnny Case at Rizin 17 on July 28, 2019. He lost the fight via corner stoppage after the first round.

Kitaoka then went on to create his own MMA promotion and fought Sho Kogane at its inaugural event Ismos 1 on July 31, 2020. The bout was declared a draw.

Before his fight at RIZIN 24, Kitaoka said restrictions from the COVID-19 pandemic didn't really change anything in his training camp and he simply followed the new rules about masks with ease. He lost the fight against Takasuke Kume via split decision.

Return to DEEP
After a stint in Rizin, Kitaoka returned to DEEP and faced Juri Ohara at Deep 100 on February 21, 2021. He lost the fight via first-round knockout.

Kitaoka is scheduled to face Takumi Suzuki at Deep 104 on October 23, 2021. Going into the fight, Kitaoka worked on conditioning extensively to make sure he was prepared for the fight. He lost the bout after getting knocked out by a knee in the third round.

Kitaoka faced Hiroto Uesako at Deep 108 Impact on July 10, 2022. He lost the bout by split decision.

Kitaoka faced Kimihiro Eto at Deep 110 Impact on November 12, 2022. He lost the bout by unanimous decision.

Kitaoka faced Yuki Takano on February 11, 2023 at DEEP 112, winning for the first time in 4 years via north-south choke in the third round.

Championships and accomplishments
Sengoku Raiden Championship
2008 Sengoku Lightweight Grand Prix Champion 
Sengoku Raiden Championship Lightweight Champion (One time; first)
DEEP
DEEP Lightweight Champion (One time; former)
Four successful title defenses

Mixed martial arts record

|-
|Win
|align=center|43–25–10
|Yuki Takano
|Submission (north-south choke)
|Deep 112 Impact
|
|align=center| 3
|align=center| 3:47
|Tokyo, Japan
|
|-
|Loss
|align=center|
|Kimihiro Eto 
|Decision (unanimous)
|Deep 110 Impact
|
|align=center|3
|align=center|5:00
|Tokyo, Japan 
|-
|Loss
|align=center|
|Hiroto Uesako
|Decision (split)
|Deep 108 Impact
|
|align=center|3
|align=center|5:00
|Tokyo, Japan
|
|-
|Loss
|align=center|42–23–10
|Takumi Suzuki
|KO (knee)
|Deep 104 Impact
|
|align=center|3
|align=center|0:27
|Tokyo, Japan
|
|-
|Loss
|align=center|42–22–10
|Juri Ohara
|KO (stomp and punches)
|Deep 100 Impact 20th Anniversary
|
|align=center|1
|align=center|4:43
|Tokyo, Japan
|
|-
|Loss
|align=center|42–21–10
|Takasuke Kume
|Decision (split)
|Rizin 24
|
|align=center|3
|align=center|5:00
|Saitama, Japan
|
|-
|Draw
|align=center|42–20–10
|Sho Kogane
|Draw
|Ismos 1
|
|align=center|3
|align=center|5:00
|Yokohama, Japan
|
|-
|Loss
|align=center|42–20–9
|Johnny Case
|TKO (corner stoppage)
|Rizin 17
|
|align=center|1
|align=center|5:00
|Saitama, Japan
|
|-
|Loss 
|align=center| 42–19–9
|Roberto de Souza
|TKO (punches)
|Rizin 15
|
|align=center|2
|align=center|3:56
|Yokohama, Japan
|
|-
|Win
|align=center| 42–18–9
|Tatsuya Kawajiri
|Decision (split) 
|RIZIN: Heisei's Last Yarennoka!
|
|align=center|3
|align=center|5:00
|Saitama, Japan
|
|-
| Loss 
| align=center| 41–18–9
| Koji Takeda
| Decision (unanimous)
| DEEP: 86 Impact
| 
| align=center| 3
| align=center| 5:00
| Tokyo, Japan
|
|-
| Loss
|align=center| 41–17–9
|Diego Brandao
|KO (punches)
|RIZIN 11
|
|align=center|1
|align=center|1:38
|Saitama, Japan
|
|- 
| Win
| align=center| 41–16–9
| Taras Sapa
| Submission (heel hook)
| Pancrase 295
| 
| align=center| 1
| align=center| 4:44
| Tokyo, Japan
|
|-
| Loss
| align=center| 40–16–9
|Kiichi Kunimoto
| Decision (unanimous)
| RIZIN World Grand Prix 2017: Second Round
|
| align=center| 2
| align=center| 5:00
|Saitama, Japan
|
|-
| Loss
| align=center| 40–15–9
| Yusuke Yachi
| TKO (punches)
| RIZIN FF 6: RIZIN World Grand Prix 2017 Opening Round Part 1
| 
| align=center| 2
| align=center| 4:46
| Saitama, Japan
| 
|-
| Win
| align=center| 40–14–9
| Daron Cruickshank
| Technical Submission (guillotine choke)
| RIZIN World Grand-Prix 2016: 2nd Round
| 
| align=center| 1
| align=center| 8:18
| Saitama, Japan
| 
|-
| Win
| align=center| 39–14–9
| Leonardo Mafra Texeira
| Submission (heel hook)
| Pancrase 281
| 
| align=center| 1
| align=center| 1:05
| Tokyo, Japan
| 
|-
| Win
| align=center| 38–14–9
| Kota Shimoishi
| Decision (unanimous)
| DEEP: 76 Impact
| 
| align=center| 3
| align=center| 5:00
| Tokyo, Japan
|
|-
| Loss
| align=center| 37–14–9
| Kazuki Tokudome
| KO (punches)
| Pancrase: 271
| 
| align=center| 4
| align=center| 1:24
| Tokyo, Japan
| 
|-
|-
|Win
|align=center| 37–13–9
|Yuki Okano
|Submission (guillotine choke)
|DEEP: Cage Impact 2015
|
|align=center|2
|align=center|0:54
|Tokyo, Japan
|
|-
|Win
|align=center| 36–13–9
|Akira Okada
|Decision (unanimous)
|Pancrase: 265
|
|align=center|3
|align=center|5:00
|Tokyo, Japan
|
|-
|Win
| align=center| 35–13–9
|Yoshiyuki Yoshida
|Decision (unanimous)
|DEEP: DREAM Impact 2014: Omisoka Special
|
|align=center| 3
|align=center| 5:00
|Saitama, Japan
|
|-
|Win
| align=center| 34–13–9
|Richie Whitson
|Decision (unanimous)
|Pancrase: 261
|
|align=center|3
|align=center|5:00
|Tokyo, Japan
|
|-
|Win
| align=center| 33–13–9
|Naoto Miyazaki
|Decision (unanimous)
|DEEP: 66 Impact
|
|align=center|3
|align=center|5:00
|Tokyo, Japan
| 
|-
|Loss
| align=center| 32–13–9
|Ramazan Esenbaev
|KO (punches)
|Inoki Bom-Ba-Ye 2013
|
|align=center|2
|align=center|0:19
|Tokyo, Japan
| 
|-
| Win
| align=center| 32–12–9
| Dom O'Grady
| Technical Submission (guillotine choke)
| Pancrase 252: 20th Anniversary
| 
| align=center| 1
| align=center| 1:19
| Yokohama, Kanagawa, Japan
|
|-
| Win
| align=center| 31–12–9
| Daisuke Nakamura
| Decision (Unanimous)
| DEEP: 62 Impact
| 
| align=center| 3
| align=center| 5:00
| Tokyo, Japan
| 
|-
| Loss
| align=center| 30–12–9
| Will Brooks
| TKO (punches)
| DREAM 18
| 
| align=center| 2
| align=center| 1:18
| Tokyo, Japan
| 
|-
| Win
| align=center| 30–11–9
| Katsunori Kikuno
| Decision (unanimous)
| DEEP: 58 Impact
| 
| align=center| 3
| align=center| 5:00
| Tokyo, Japan
| 
|-
| Loss
| align=center| 29–11–9
| Shinya Aoki
| Decision (unanimous)
| Fight For Japan: Genki Desu Ka Omisoka 2011
| 
| align=center| 5
| align=center| 5:00
| Saitama, Saitama, Japan
| 
|-
| Win
| align=center| 29–10–9
| Willamy Freire
| Decision (split)
| DREAM 17
| 
| align=center| 3
| align=center| 5:00
| Saitama, Saitama, Japan
| 
|-
| Win
| align=center| 28–10–9
| Jutaro Nakao
| Decision (unanimous)
| DEEP: 53 Impact
| 
| align=center| 3
| align=center| 5:00
| Tokyo, Japan
| 
|-
| Win
| align=center| 27–10–9
| Kuniyoshi Hironaka
| Submission (guillotine choke)
| Pancrase: Passion Tour 9
| 
| align=center| 2
| align=center| 4:22
| Tokyo, Japan
| 
|-
| Win
| align=center| 26–10–9
| Jorge Rodrigues
| Decision (unanimous)
| Pancrase: Passion Tour 5
| 
| align=center| 3
| align=center| 5:00
| Tokyo, Japan
| 
|-
| Loss
| align=center| 25–10–9
| Jorge Masvidal
| KO (punches)
| World Victory Road Presents: Sengoku 11
| 
| align=center| 2
| align=center| 3:23
| Tokyo, Japan
| 
|-
| Loss
| align=center| 25–9–9
| Mizuto Hirota
| TKO (knees)
| World Victory Road Presents: Sengoku 9
| 
| align=center| 4
| align=center| 2:50
| Saitama, Saitama, Japan
| 
|-
| Win
| align=center| 25–8–9
| Yukio Sakaguchi
| Submission (achilles lock)
| Pancrase: Changing Tour 3
| 
| align=center| 1
| align=center| 1:26
| Saitama, Saitama, Japan
| 
|-
| Win
| align=center| 24–8–9
| Takanori Gomi
| Submission (achilles lock)
| World Victory Road Presents: Sengoku no Ran 2009
| 
| align=center| 1
| align=center| 1:41
| Saitama, Japan
| 
|-
| Win
| align=center| 23–8–9
| Kazunori Yokota
| Decision (unanimous)
| World Victory Road Presents: Sengoku 6
| 
| align=center| 3
| align=center| 5:00
| Saitama, Japan
| 
|-
| Win
| align=center| 22–8–9
| Eiji Mitsuoka
| Submission (heel hook)
| World Victory Road Presents: Sengoku 6
| 
| align=center| 1
| align=center| 1:16
| Saitama, Japan
| 
|-
| Win
| align=center| 21–8–9
| Clay French
| Submission (achilles lock)
| World Victory Road Presents: Sengoku 4
| 
| align=center| 1
| align=center| 0:31
| Saitama, Japan
| 
|-
| Win
| align=center| 20–8–9
| Ian James Schaffa
| Submission (guillotine choke)
| World Victory Road Presents: Sengoku 2
| 
| align=center| 1
| align=center| 0:50
| Tokyo, Japan
| 
|-
| Loss
| align=center| 19–8–9
| Katsuya Inoue
| Decision (split)
| Pancrase: Shining 1
| 
| align=center| 3
| align=center| 5:00
| Tokyo, Japan
| 
|-
| Win
| align=center| 19–7–9
| Jason Palacios
| Decision (split)
| Pancrase: Rising 6
| 
| align=center| 3
| align=center| 5:00
| Tokyo, Japan
| 
|-
| Win
| align=center| 18–7–9
| Fabricio Monteiro
| Submission (arm-triangle choke)
| DEEP: 29 Impact
| 
| align=center| 2
| align=center| 2:37
| Tokyo, Japan
| 
|-
| Win
| align=center| 17–7–9
| Gustavo Picone
| Decision (unanimous)
| Pancrase: Rising 2
| 
| align=center| 3
| align=center| 5:00
| Tokyo, Japan
| 
|-
| Win
| align=center| 16–7–9
| Ju Pyo Hong
| Submission (achilles lock)
| Pancrase: Blow 9
| 
| align=center| 1
| align=center| 0:24
| Tokyo, Japan
| 
|-
| Win
| align=center| 15–7–9
| Paul Daley
| Submission (guillotine choke)
| Pancrase: Blow 6
| 
| align=center| 1
| align=center| 2:54
| Yokohama, Japan
| 
|-
| Loss
| align=center| 14–7–9
| Daizo Ishige
| Decision (unanimous)
| Pancrase: Blow 4
| 
| align=center| 3
| align=center| 5:00
| Tokyo, Japan
| 
|-
| Win
| align=center| 14–6–9
| Tatsunori Tanaka
| Submission (guillotine choke)
| Pancrase: Blow 2
| 
| align=center| 2
| align=center| 2:53
| Osaka, Japan
| 
|-
| Draw
| align=center| 13–6–9
| Katsuya Inoue
| Draw
| Pancrase: Blow 1
| 
| align=center| 3
| align=center| 5:00
| Tokyo, Japan
| 
|-
| Win
| align=center| 13–6–8
| Carlos Condit
| Submission (heel hook)
| Pancrase: Spiral 8
| 
| align=center| 1
| align=center| 3:57
| Yokohama, Japan
| 
|-
| Win
| align=center| 12–6–8
| Thomas Schulte
| Submission (heel hook)
| Pancrase: Spiral 5
| 
| align=center| 1
| align=center| 1:11
| Yokohama, Japan
| 
|-
| Win
| align=center| 11–6–8
| Hidehiko Hasegawa
| Decision (split)
| Pancrase: Spiral 2
| 
| align=center| 3
| align=center| 5:00
| Yokohama, Japan
| 
|-
| Loss
| align=center| 10–6–8
| Katsuya Inoue
| Decision (unanimous)
| Pancrase: Brave 10
| 
| align=center| 3
| align=center| 5:00
| Tokyo, Japan
| 
|-
| Draw
| align=center| 10–5–8
| Heath Sims
| Draw
| Pancrase: Brave 8
| 
| align=center| 3
| align=center| 5:00
| Tokyo, Japan
| 
|-
| Win
| align=center| 10–5–7
| Kurt Pellegrino
| Submission (guillotine choke)
| Pancrase: 2004 Neo-Blood Tournament Semifinals
| 
| align=center| 2
| align=center| 0:34
| Tokyo, Japan
| 
|-
| Win
| align=center| 9–5–7
| Takaichi Hirayama
| Submission (guillotine choke)
| Pancrase: Brave 5
| 
| align=center| 2
| align=center| 4:05
| Tokyo, Japan
| 
|-
| Loss
| align=center| 8–5–7
| Eiji Ishikawa
| Decision (unanimous)
| Pancrase: Brave 3
| 
| align=center| 3
| align=center| 5:00
| Tokyo, Japan
| 
|-
| Draw
| align=center| 8–4–7
| Tadahiro Hosaka
| Draw
| Pancrase: Brave 2
| 
| align=center| 2
| align=center| 5:00
| Osaka, Japan
| 
|-
| Win
| align=center| 8–4–6
| Naoki Seki
| Decision (unanimous)
| Pancrase: Hybrid 9
| 
| align=center| 3
| align=center| 5:00
| Tokyo, Japan
| 
|-
| Draw
| align=center| 7–4–6
| Yuji Hoshino
| Draw
| Pancrase: Hybrid 7
| 
| align=center| 3
| align=center| 5:00
| Osaka, Japan
| 
|-
| Draw
| align=center| 7–4–5
| Takuya Wada
| Draw
| Pancrase: Hybrid 4
| 
| align=center| 2
| align=center| 5:00
| Tokyo, Japan
| 
|-
| Win
| align=center| 7–4–4
| Hiroki Nagaoka
| Decision (unanimous)
| Pancrase: Hybrid 1
| 
| align=center| 2
| align=center| 5:00
| Tokyo, Japan
| 
|-
| Win
| align=center| 6–4–4
| Taro Minato
| Decision (majority)
| Pancrase: Spirit 7
| 
| align=center| 2
| align=center| 5:00
| Tokyo, Japan
| 
|-
| Loss
| align=center| 5–4–4
| Hidetaka Monma
| KO (knee)
| Pancrase: 2002 Neo-Blood Tournament Second Round
| 
| align=center| 1
| align=center| 0:05
| Tokyo, Japan
| 
|-
| Win
| align=center| 5–3–4
| Kenji Arai
| Submission (toe hold)
| Pancrase: 2002 Neo-Blood Tournament Second Round
| 
| align=center| 3
| align=center| 2:08
| Tokyo, Japan
| 
|-
| Win
| align=center| 4–3–4
| Hiroyuki Nozawa
| Decision (unanimous)
| Pancrase: 2002 Neo-Blood Tournament Opening Round
| 
| align=center| 2
| align=center| 5:00
| Tokyo, Japan
| 
|-
| Win
| align=center| 3–3–4
| Kenji Arai
| Decision (majority)
| Pancrase: Spirit 4
| 
| align=center| 2
| align=center| 5:00
| Osaka, Japan
| 
|-
| Loss
| align=center| 2–3–4
| Koji Oishi
| Decision (majority)
| Pancrase: Spirit 3
| 
| align=center| 2
| align=center| 5:00
| Tokyo, Japan
| 
|-
| Draw
| align=center| 2–2–4
| Hiroki Nagaoka
| Draw
| Pancrase: Proof 7
| 
| align=center| 2
| align=center| 5:00
| Yokohama, Japan
| 
|-
| Win
| align=center| 2–2–3
| Yohei Ota
| Decision (39-38)
| GCM: The Contenders 6
| 
| align=center| 2
| align=center| 5:00
| Yokohama, Japan
| 
|-
| Draw
| align=center| 1–2–3
| Junya Miyakawa
| Draw
| Pancrase: Proof 5
| 
| align=center| 2
| align=center| 5:00
| Osaka, Japan
| 
|-
| Draw
| align=center| 1–2–2
| Kenichi Serizawa
| Draw
| GCM: Club Contenders 1
| 
| align=center| 2
| align=center| 3:00
| Tokyo, Japan
| 
|-
| Loss
| align=center| 1–2–1
| Yuji Hoshino
| Decision (unanimous)
| Pancrase: Proof 4
| 
| align=center| 2
| align=center| 5:00
| Tokyo, Japan
| 
|-
| Draw
| align=center| 1–1–1
| Kousei Kubota
| Draw
| Pancrase: Proof 2
| 
| align=center| 2
| align=center| 5:00
| Osaka, Japan
| 
|-
| Win
| align=center| 1–1
| Kazuhito Kikuchi
| Decision (unanimous)
| Pancrase: Trans 8
| 
| align=center| 1
| align=center| 10:00
| Aomori, Aomori, Japan
| 
|-
| Loss
| align=center| 0–1
| Yoshinori Kawasaki
| Decision (majority)
| Pancrase: Trans 6
| 
| align=center| 1
| align=center| 10:00
| Tokyo, Japan
|

See also
 List of current mixed martial arts champions
 List of male mixed martial artists

References

External links

1980 births
Living people
Japanese male mixed martial artists
Lightweight mixed martial artists
Mixed martial artists utilizing shoot wrestling
Mixed martial artists utilizing judo
Mixed martial artists utilizing Brazilian jiu-jitsu
Japanese practitioners of Brazilian jiu-jitsu
People awarded a black belt in Brazilian jiu-jitsu
Japanese male judoka
World Victory Road champions
People from Nara, Nara
Deep (mixed martial arts) champions